= Shoreline segmentation =

Method of shoreline analysis

Shoreline segmentation is a specialized task within the broader field of water body segmentation in remote sensing and computer vision. While water body segmentation refers to the process of delineating all water-covered areas (such as lakes, rivers, and seas) within an image, shoreline segmentation specifically targets the precise extraction of the boundary line between land and water—known as the shoreline.

== Importance and challenges ==
Shoreline, as the land-water interface, is the home (within 100 km) to more than 2 billion people globally. Accurately segmenting shorelines is essential for numerous environmental, engineering, and geospatial applications, including coastal monitoring, change detection, habitat assessment, and disaster response. Unlike general water body segmentation, shoreline segmentation places a high priority on the accurate localization of edges, particularly those that do not coincide with the image boundary. These internal shoreline edges are crucial for quantifying shoreline change, calculating erosion rates, and supporting hydrodynamic modeling.

== Limitations of conventional metrics ==
Traditional evaluation metrics for image segmentation, such as Intersection over Union (IoU) and pixel accuracy, are designed to assess the overall overlap between predicted and ground truth regions. However, these metrics do not fully capture the accuracy of the shoreline itself, especially the quality of the detected edge within the interior of the image. This is because a model may achieve high IoU or pixel accuracy by correctly labeling large water and land regions while still producing significant errors along the critical shoreline boundary.

To address this limitation, additional edge-focused evaluation measures—such as boundary IoU, Frechet and Hausdorff distance, or contour-based accuracy—are increasingly used to assess shoreline segmentation performance. These specialized metrics are better suited for evaluating how closely the predicted shoreline matches the actual shoreline, which is often the most important aspect for practical coastal and environmental analyses.

== Datasets ==
Several datasets have been developed for shoreline segmentation and related tasks. For shoreline segmentation specifically, the Coastal Aerial Imagery Dataset (CAID) was released in August 2025, comprising more than 20,000 manually annotated coastal aerial images dedicated to shoreline mapping.

For multi-label datasets that include shoreline areas, examples include DeepGlobe, ATLANTIS, and GID. These datasets contain hundreds to thousands of images featuring water–land interfaces; however, they were not explicitly designed for shoreline segmentation, as water is only one among many land cover classes represented.

Other datasets focus on water–land interaction zones, such as Sen1Floods11, UrbanSARFloods, DaliWS, S1S2-Water, WaterNet, and SWED. While these collections emphasize aquatic and flood environments, they are not tailored for shoreline segmentation and thus do not encompass the full diversity of shoreline landscapes.

== Bibliography ==
- Ciecholewski, Marcin (March 2024). "Review of Segmentation Methods for Coastline Detection in SAR Images". Archives of Computational Methods in Engineering. 31 (2): 839–869. doi:10.1007/s11831-023-10000-7.
- Erdem, Firat; Bayram, Bulent; Bakirman, Tolga; Bayrak, Onur Can; Akpinar, Burak (February 2021). "An ensemble deep learning based shoreline segmentation approach (WaterNet) from Landsat 8 OLI images". Advances in Space Research. 67 (3): 964–974. Bibcode:2021AdSpR..67..964E. doi:10.1016/j.asr.2020.10.043.
- Jaszcz, Antoni; Włodarczyk-Sielicka, Marta; Stateczny, Andrzej; Połap, Dawid; Garczyńska, Ilona (27 November 2024). "Automated Shoreline Segmentation in Satellite Imagery Using USV Measurements". Remote Sensing. 16 (23): 4457. Bibcode:2024RemS...16.4457J. doi:10.3390/rs16234457.
